The Cradle is a 1922 American silent drama film directed by Paul Powell and written by Olga Printzlau. The film stars Ethel Clayton, Charles Meredith, Mary Jane Irving, Anna Lehr, Walter McGrail, and Adele Farrington. The film was released on March 4, 1922, by Paramount Pictures.

The film is preserved in the Library of Congress collections.

Plot
As described in a film magazine, Margaret Harvey's (Clayton) husband, physician Dr. Robert Harvey (Meredith), is won away from his home by an attractive patient. A divorce follows and the doctor marries the patient. Margaret marries an old admirer, and the child Doris (Irving) is assigned to the custody of both parents for alternate periods of six months each. Both the step-mother and step-father resent the child's presence in their homes, and estrangement disturbs both households. The serious illness of the child results in the realization that the bond of parentage is stronger than man-made marriage, and the film closes with two more divorces and the prospect of a remarriage.

Cast
Ethel Clayton as Margaret Harvey
Charles Meredith as Dr. Robert Harvey
Mary Jane Irving as Doris Harvey
Anna Lehr as Lola Forbes
Walter McGrail as Courtney Webster
Adele Farrington as Mrs. Mason

References

External links

1922 films
1920s English-language films
Silent American drama films
1922 drama films
Paramount Pictures films
Films directed by Paul Powell (director)
American black-and-white films
American silent feature films
American films based on plays
Surviving American silent films
1920s American films